Katarina Srebotnik was the defending champion, but lost in second round to Petra Mandula.

Amanda Coetzer won the title by defeating Mariana Díaz Oliva 7–5, 6–3 in the final. It was the 9th and last title for Coetzer in her career.

Seeds
The first two seeds received a bye into the second round.

Draw

Finals

Top half

Bottom half

References

External links
 Tournament Profile (ITF)

2003 Abierto Mexicano Telefonica Movistar
Singles